Montu Pilot is Bengali web series directed by Debaloy Bhattacharya that features Saurav Das, Solanki Roy, Chandreyee Ghosh, Kanchan Mullick and Subrata Dutta in the main roles.

Description 
Directed by Debaloy Bhattacharya, the teaser was released on 19 November 2019. On 1 December the official trailer of Montu Pilot released on the Bengali OTT platform Hoichoi.

The series is about the character Montu who wanted to be a pilot in his childhood. His mother tried everything to take him out from the red-light area of Neelkuthi but failed and met a terrible end. Montu becomes a pimp, a transporter of escorts, and he does not understand love and cannot feel sensitive emotions. However, his life changes when he meets Bhromor.

Cast 
Saurav Das as Montu Pilot 
Solanki Roy as Bhromor
Chandrayee Ghosh as Bibijaan
Kanchan Mullick as Taufik
Subrat Dutta as Doctor
Alivia Sarkar as Shoroma
Rafiath Rashid Mithila as Bonhi
Suzi Bhowmik as Transgender Brothel worker

Episodes

Season 1 (2019)
Montu Pilot started streaming on hoichoi on 13 December 2019 with five episodes.

Season 2 (2022)
Montu Pilot is back in Neelkuthi as a man who has nothing to lose. He pawns the unwitting Bonhi in a bid to avenge his fate. Will Neelkuthi survive the wrath of an enraged Montu? Season 2 started premiering on hoichoi on 29 April 2022.

Episodes

References

External links

Indian web series
2017 web series debuts
Bengali-language web series
Hoichoi original programming